Hermeuptychia is a genus of satyrid butterflies found in the Neotropical realm. They are a widespread, cryptic genus, with Cytochrome c oxidase subunit I species delineation methods implying much greater species diversity than currently recognised.

Species
The genus contains the following species, listed alphabetically:

Hermeuptychia atalanta (Butler, 1867)
Hermeuptychia cucullina (Weymer, 1911)
Hermeuptychia fallax (C. & R. Felder, 1862)
Hermeuptychia gisella (Hayward, 1957)
Hermeuptychia harmonia (Butler, 1867)
Hermeuptychia hermes (Fabricius, 1775)
Hermeuptychia hermybius Grishin, 2014
Hermeuptychia intricata Grishin, 2014
Hermeuptychia maimoune (Butler, 1870)
Hermeuptychia pimpla (C. & R. Felder, 1862)
Hermeuptychia sosybius (Fabricius, 1793)

References

Euptychiina
Nymphalidae of South America
Butterfly genera
Taxa named by Walter Forster (entomologist)